The forced labor camps of Hortobágy were established by the communist regime in the eastern parts of Hungary in the early 1950s. 

Between 1950 and 1953 about ten thousand people were taken here without a legal verdict. They worked under armed supervision and in inhumane conditions on the state farms in Hortobágy, Nagykunság and Hajdúság.

The deportations began on June 23, 1950. Thousands of families from the western and southern borders, deemed unsafe because of the Cold War by the government at the time (Dobi István, Rákosi Mátyas, Nagy Imre), were taken to the twelve labor camps on the Alföld. They had barely an hour to pack, their papers were taken and their beds were about half a meter wide. Their forced labor took place on the state farms of nearby villages until the first Nagy Imre government declared amnesty in July 1953.

The camps were closed that fall. The prisoners could not return to their homes and were employed as unskilled laborers. Their real estate and money was confiscated by the state, which hoped to frighten the population. None were compensated.

List

Memorial 
Those forced laborers who were still alive in 2000 founded the Association of those Deported to the Labor Camps of Hortobágy (Hortobágyi Kényszermunkatáborokba Elhurcoltak Egyesülete). It has 915 members as of 2009. A stone was erected to recognize those incarcerated.

References

Further reading 
 Beke Ferencné (dr. Barton Attila és Jeney Attila szerk.): Három év Hortobágy poklában (Kráter Kiadó, Pomáz, 2002) 

Penal labour
1950s in Hungary